The Yosemite Community College District is a public community college district in Stanislaus County and Tuolumne County, California.

Colleges
Colleges within the  California Community Colleges System district include:
 Columbia College — located in Sonora, in the Sierra Nevada foothills
 Modesto Junior College — located in Modesto, in the central San Joaquin Valley.

External links
 Official website

California Community Colleges
Universities and colleges in Stanislaus County, California
Universities and colleges in Tuolumne County, California
Schools accredited by the Western Association of Schools and Colleges
Government of Stanislaus County, California
Government of Tuolumne County, California